Campylidium sommerfeltii is a species of moss belonging to the family Amblystegiaceae.

References

Hypnales